Bedavati Buragohain was an Indian politician. She was a Member of Parliament, representing Assam in the Rajya Sabha the upper house of India's Parliament as a member of the Indian National Congress.

References

1911 births
Year of death missing
Rajya Sabha members from Assam
Indian National Congress politicians from Assam
Women in Assam politics
Women members of the Rajya Sabha